Bryotropha boreella is a moth of the family Gelechiidae. It has a disjunct alpine-boreal distribution. It is locally common in central and northern Europe, northern England and Scotland. In Scandinavia, it is found in north-western Denmark, Sweden and Finland. It is also present in the French Alps, Germany (Sauerland, the Harz and the Alps) and Austria. Records from the Ural need confirmation.

The wingspan is 13–15 mm for males and 11–12 mm for females. The forewings of the males are slightly shining greyish black and the hindwings are fuscous grey. Females have more pointed forewings than males and the hindwings have a more pronounced apex. Adults have been recorded on wing from June to early August. The males fly in the late morning sunshine, while females mostly hide down in the vegetation.

References

Moths described in 1851
boreella
Moths of Europe